Connor Patrick Ronan (born 6 March 1998) is a professional footballer who plays as a midfielder for Major League Soccer side Colorado Rapids. Born in Rochdale, England, he represents the Republic of Ireland national team.

Club career
Ronan started his career with Copperpot JFC and attended St Cuthbert's RC High School in Rochdale with whom he reached the final of the English National Schools Cup as a Year 7 in 2009 with a team that also included Axel Tuanzebe, Kisimba Kisimba and Johny Diba, who all went on to become professional. He then joined Rochdale, his boyhood club in which he stayed until he joined Wolverhampton Wanderers at the age of 16. Ronan made three appearances for the team's development squad in the 2016–17 EFL Trophy, scoring a goal in their 4–0 win over EFL League Two team Accrington Stanley. With Paul Lambert as manager, Ronan was part of the first-team squad for the first time on 26 November 2016, as an unused substitute in the 2–0 defeat to Sheffield Wednesday. Ronan made his debut on 17 December 2016, replacing Hélder Costa for the final nine minutes of the team's 2–0 win over Nottingham Forest.

On 31 August 2018, Ronan joined League One club Walsall on loan until January 2019 along with team-mate Connor Johnson.
Ronan returned to Wolves at the conclusion of his loan spell, making 15 appearances in all competitions for Walsall.

He signed for League One club Blackpool on a six-month loan deal on 17 January 2020. His playing time was however restricted to ten games after the League One clubs voted to curtail the season owing to the COVID-19 outbreak.

In August 2020, he signed a new contract – lasting until 2024 – with Wolves before again being sent out on loan, this time joining Swiss side Grasshoppers for the 2020–21 season. His would make his first appearance coming on as a substitute in the second half, in a 3–0 victory against FC Wil. Ronan's first goal for the Swiss club came in a 3–0 home win against Neuchâtel Xamax, when he scored the second goal in the 91st minute.

In May 2020, Ronan returned to his parent club for treatment, after breaking his metatarsal bone, ruling him out for up to four to five months.

On 31 August 2021, Ronan sealed a season long loan to Scottish Premiership side St Mirren. He made his debut in a 0–0 draw at home to Dundee United in September.  He made a habit of scoring sensational long range goals throughout his spell at St. Mirren, including a 30-yard strike in the Scottish Cup quarter-final. 

On 23 January 2023, Ronan signed a four-year deal with the Colorado Rapids in Denver. It will see him play through to the 2026 Major League Soccer season, with an additional club option for 2027.

International career
Ronan has played at under 17, under 19 and under 21 level for the Republic of Ireland. Ronan was selected for the 2019 Toulon Tournament where he played in every match.

He was called up to the senior Republic of Ireland squad for the friendlies against Belgium and Lithuania on 26 and 29 March 2022 respectively.

Career statistics

References

External links

1998 births
Living people
Footballers from Rochdale
English footballers
England youth international footballers
Republic of Ireland association footballers
Republic of Ireland youth international footballers
Republic of Ireland under-21 international footballers
Association football midfielders
Rochdale A.F.C. players
Wolverhampton Wanderers F.C. players
Portsmouth F.C. players
Walsall F.C. players
FC DAC 1904 Dunajská Streda players
Slovak Super Liga players
Blackpool F.C. players
Grasshopper Club Zürich players
St Mirren F.C. players
Colorado Rapids players
English Football League players
Swiss Challenge League players
Scottish Professional Football League players
English expatriate footballers
Republic of Ireland expatriate association footballers
Expatriate footballers in Slovakia
Expatriate footballers in Switzerland
Irish expatriate sportspeople in Slovakia
English people of Irish descent